Women Without Names is a 1940 American drama film directed by Robert Florey.

Plot

Cast 
 Ellen Drew as Joyce King  
 Robert Paige as Fred MacNeil  
 Judith Barrett as Peggy Athens  
 John Miljan as District Attorney John Marlin  
 Fay Helm as Millie  
 John McGuire as Walter Ferris  
 Louise Beavers as Ivory  
 James Seay as O'Grane  
 Esther Dale as Head Matron Ingles  
 Marjorie Main as Matron Lowery   
 Audrey Maynard as Maggie  
 Kitty Kelly as Countess  
 Virginia Dabney as Ruffles McWade  
 Helen Lynch as Susie  
 Mae Busch as Rose

External links 
 

1940 films
Films directed by Robert Florey
Paramount Pictures films
1940 crime drama films
American crime drama films
American black-and-white films
1940s American films